This is a list of marquisates in Portugal.

A

 Marquess of Abrantes
 Marquis of Aguiar
 Marquis of Alegrete
 Marquis of Alenquer
 Marquis of Alorna
 Marquis of Alvito
 Marquis of Angeja
 Marquis of Angra
 Marquis of Arronches
 Marquis of Atouguia
 Marquis of Ávila and Bolama

B

 Marquis of Basto
 Marquis of Belas
 Marquis of Bemposta
 Marquis of Bemposta-Subserra
 Marquis of Borba

C

 Marquis of Cadaval
 Marquis of Campo Maior
 Marquis of Cascais
 Marquis of Castelo Melhor
 Marquis of Castelo Novo
 Marquis of Castelo Rodrigo
 Marquis of Castro
 Marquis of Chaves

F

 Marquis of Faial
 Marquis of Faria
 Marquis of Ferreira
 Marquis of Ficalho
 Marquess of Fontes
 Marquis de Fontes Pereira de Melo
 Marquis of Foz
 Marquis of Franco e Almodôvar
 Marquis of Fronteira
 Marquis of Funchal

G

 Marquis of Gouveia
 Marquis of Graciosa

J

 Marquis of Jácome Correia

L

 Marquis of Lavradio
 Marquis of Lindoso
 Marquis of Loulé
 Marquis of Louriçal
 Marquis of Lumiares

M

 Marquis of Marialva
 Marquis of Mendia
 Marquis of Minas
 Marquis of Monfalim
 Marquis of Montalvão
 Marquis of Montebelo
 Marquis of Montemor-o-Novo

N

 Marquis of Nisa

O

 Marquis of Olhão

P

 Marquis of Palmela
 Marquis of Penafiel
 Marquis of Penalva
 Marquis of Pomares
 Marquis of Pombal
 Marquis of Pombeiro
 Marquis of Ponta Delgada
 Marquis of Ponte do Lima
 Marquis of Porto Seguro
 Marquis of Praia e Monforte

R

 Marquis of Reriz
 Marquis of Ribeira Grande
 Marquis of Rio Maior

S

 Marquis of Sá da Bandeira
 Marquis of Sabugosa
 Marquis of Saldanha
 Marquis of Sande
 Marquis of Santa Cruz
 Marquis of Santa Iria
 Marquis of Santarém
 Marquis of São Lourenço
 Marquis of São Miguel
 Marquis of São Paio
 Marquis of Sesimbra
 Marquis of Soydos
 Marquis of Soure
 Marquis of Sousa Holstein
 Marquis of Soveral

T

 Marquis of Tancos
 Marquis of Tavora
 Marquis of Terena
 Marquis of Tomar
 Marquis of Torres Novas
 Marquis of Torres Vedras
 Marquis of Trancoso

U

 Marquis of Unhão

V

 Marquis of Vagos
 Marquis of Valada
 Marquis of Vale Flor
 Marquis of Valença
 Marquis of Viana
 Marquis of Vila Flor
 Marquis of Vila Real
 Marquis of Vila Viçosa

See also
 Portuguese nobility
 List of Dukedoms in Portugal
 List of Countships in Portugal
 List of Viscountcies in Portugal
 List of Barons in Portugal

External links
Portuguese Aristocracy Titles in a Portuguese Genealogical site

Portugal
 
Marquesses